LTM Recordings (originally les temps modernes) is a British independent record label founded in 1983, and best known for reissues of artists and music from 1978 to the present day, as well as modern classical and avant-garde composition. The label is based in Norfolk, England, and is curated by James Nice.

Particularly notable are reissues of catalogue originally released by Factory Records, Les Disques du Crépuscule, Compact Organisation and Sarah Records. Nice has also reactivated the Factory Benelux and Crépuscule labels, for reissues and new releases.

LTM has also released audiobooks with archive recordings by major figures in 20th Century avant-garde art, including Futurism & Dada Reviewed, Voices of Dada, Surrealism Reviewed, Musica Futurista: The Art of Noises, Bauhaus Reviewed and Cocteau Satie and Les Six.

History
James Nice started LTM as a cassette label, 'Les Temps Moderne', which became a record label proper in 1984. LTM went into hibernation when he relocated to Brussels to join Crépuscule, where he worked on new releases as well as reissues of Crépuscule and Factory Benelux catalogue, and ran his own sublabel, Interior. After several years at Crépuscule and PIAS he revived LTM, and also worked as a lawyer (including representing some Factory artists against London Records in the mid-1990s).

Nice is also the author of Shadowplayers: The Rise and Fall of Factory Records (2010), and the earlier documentary Shadowplayers on the same subject (2006).

Artists on the LTM label 
 Antena
 Aberdeen
 A Certain Ratio
 Isabelle Antena
 Blurt
 Blue Orchids
 Biting Tongues
 William S. Burroughs
 Steven Brown
 Berntholer
 Crawling Chaos
 Cath Carroll
 Celletti Alessandra
 Crispy Ambulance
 Anna Domino
 Diagram Brothers
 Dislocation Dance
 Department S
 Devine & Statton
 French Impressionists
 Foreign Press
 The Field Mice
 Gnac
 Gina X Performance
 Gilbert & Lewis
 Paul Haig
 Hermine
 Isolation Ward
 Richard Jobson
 Josef K
 Kalima
 Kid Montana
 Ludus
 Virna Lindt
 Lowlife
 Minimal man
 Minny Pops
 Miaow
 Marine
 The Names
 Northside
 Northern Picture Library
 The Occasional Keepers
 The Orchids
 The Other Two
 The Passage
 Peter Principle
 Quando Quango
 Blaine L. Reininger
 The Room
 Revenge
 Eric Random
 The Royal Family and the Poor
 Erik Satie
 Savage Republic
 Severed Heads
 Alison Statton & Spike
 Stockholm Monsters
 Section 25
 23 Skidoo
 Thick Pigeon
 Winston Tong
 Tuxedomoon
 Trembling Blue Stars
 Tunnelvision
 Ultramarine
 The Wake
 Wyndham Lewis
 X-O-Dus

See also
 Factory Benelux/Les Disques du Crépuscule
 List of record labels

References

External links
 LTM label official site
 Discography at Discogs

British independent record labels
Record labels established in 1983
Reissue record labels